Energi Viborg Arena (originally Viborg Stadion) is a football stadium located in Viborg, Denmark. It is the home ground of Viborg FF and has a capacity of 9,566. The stadium is part of Viborg Stadion Center and is owned by Viborg Municipality. It is the home stadium of the Danish international women’s division. Since October 2011, it has been known as Energi Viborg Arena due to a sponsorship arrangement, giving naming rights to Energi Viborg, a regional energy group. It was one of four venues for the 2011 UEFA European Under-21 Football Championship, hosting three matches in Group B and a semi-final. The old stadium from 1931 was torn down in 2001 to make room for a new stadium with 9,566 seats. The new stadium came with covered seating and heating in the field. The extensions around the new stadium were finished in 2007 and provided extra standing places for both home and away team fans. In 2008 two big screens were added to the new stadium. Other uses have included hosting concerts with a capacity of 22,000 concertgoers.

References

External links 
  Public service homepage

Viborg FF
Football venues in Denmark
Stadion
Buildings and structures in Viborg Municipality